William Dallas Bynum (June 26, 1846 – October 21, 1927) was a U.S. Representative from Indiana from 1885 to 1895.

Bynum was born near Newberry, Indiana. Although he lived for some time in Washington D.C., he was a lifelong Hoosier. He was educated in the state's schools, graduated from Indiana University, studied and practiced law there, started his political career in Washington, Indiana, and, after his service in the other Washington, returned to Indiana. There, he lived out the remainder of his days.

After graduation from Indiana University in 1869, Bynum studied law. He was admitted to the bar in 1872, hung out a shingle, and set up practice in Washington, Indiana.

Political life
He was Washington's first City Clerk. He was City Attorney from 1871 until 1875, and Mayor from 1876 until 1879.

In 1880, he moved from Daviess County to Indianapolis. He was a member of the Indiana House of Representatives from 1881 until 1885, serving as House Speaker in 1885.

Bynum was elected as a Democrat to the Forty-ninth and to the four succeeding Congresses (March 4, 1885 – March 3, 1895). For part of that time he was House Minority Whip.

In 1890, Bynum was censured for calling a Republican foe a tyrant and despot — and was censured by the Republican majority for "unparliamentary language". As he walked down the aisle to receive his punishment, the entire Democratic side rose, went down and stood in a solid body with him.

He was an unsuccessful candidate for reelection in 1894 to the Fifty-fourth Congress.

Remaining in the nation's capital, Bynum was active in the organization of the National (Gold-Standard) Democratic Party, in 1896. He chaired its national committee through 1898.

In 1900, Bynum was appointed by President McKinley to be a member of a commission to codify the United States' criminal laws. He served on the commission until 1906.

He then returned to Indiana and retired from the practice of law.

He died in Indianapolis on October 21, 1927 and was interred in Oak Grove Cemetery, in Washington, Indiana.

See also
List of United States representatives expelled, censured, or reprimanded

References

External links

1846 births
1927 deaths
Censured or reprimanded members of the United States House of Representatives
Democratic Party members of the United States House of Representatives from Indiana
Indiana University Bloomington alumni
Speakers of the Indiana House of Representatives